Caleb Duvernay (born July 24, 1996) is an American professional soccer player who plays as a defender.

Career

College & Youth
Duvernay played four years of college soccer at the North Carolina State University between 2014 and 2017.

While at college, Duvernay played with Carolina RailHawks U23s in the National Premier Soccer League in 2015 and 2016, and North Carolina FC U23 in the USL PDL in 2017.

Professional
On January 21, 2018, Duvernay was selected 61st overall in the 2018 MLS SuperDraft by Portland Timbers. However, he did not sign with the club. He instead spent 2018 playing in the USL PDL with North Carolina U23.

On March 15, 2019, Duvernay signed his first professional contract with USL Championship side North Carolina FC. He appeared in 16 games with the club over parts of two seasons before leaving the team on August 24, 2020.

References

1996 births
Living people
American soccer players
Association football defenders
NC State Wolfpack men's soccer players
North Carolina FC U23 players
North Carolina FC players
Soccer players from North Carolina
National Premier Soccer League players
USL League Two players
USL Championship players
Portland Timbers draft picks